Greg White (born March 31, 1959) is an American basketball coach, the head coach at Marshall University and an assistant coach for the UCLA Bruins. He is also a motivational speaker at universities and businesses.

He graduated from the (now closed) Mullens High School in Mullens, WV and went on to play at NCAA Division I Marshall University, where he is a member of the school's Hall of Fame. He was a record setting point guard, starting 113 consecutive games from 1977 to 1981. His teams amassed an 87–17 home record in Marshall's Cam Henderson Center. Additionally, his teams at Marshall had a record setting 27 game home win streak and were 34–3 in home games against non conference teams. In 2002, Greg's Marshall team lead all Division I basketball teams in 3 point field goal shooting percentage at 44% and he had 18 all conference players during his time as Marshall's head coach.

He has written several books including The Winning Edge and Success: Attitude is Everything.. His basketball camps attracted over 1000 attendees per summer at their peak.

Head coaching record

References

1958 births
Living people
American men's basketball players
Basketball coaches from West Virginia
Basketball players from West Virginia
Charleston Golden Eagles men's basketball coaches
Marshall Thundering Herd men's basketball coaches
Marshall Thundering Herd men's basketball players
People from Mullens, West Virginia
Pikeville Bears men's basketball coaches
UCLA Bruins men's basketball coaches